David Allen Aaker (born 1938) is an American organizational theorist, consultant and Professor Emeritus at the University of California, Berkeley's Haas School of Business, a specialist in  marketing   with a   focus on brand strategy. He serves as Vice Chairman of the San Francisco-based  growth consulting company Prophet.

Biography 
Aaker received his SB in Management from the MIT Sloan School of Management and then his MA in Statistics and PhD in Business Administration at  Stanford University.
 
He is the E.T. Grether Professor Emeritus of Marketing Strategy at the Haas School of Business  and the currently the vice chairman of Prophet, a global brand and marketing consultancy firm, and an advisor to Dentsu, a Japanese advertising agency.

He has been awarded three career awards for contributions to the science of marketing: The Paul D. Converse Award; The Vijay Mahajan Award; and The Buck Weaver Award. Aaker was inducted into the New York American Marketing Association's Hall of Fame in 2015.

Aaker has won the award for "best article" in the California Management Review and in the Journal of Marketing (twice). His book, Brand Relevance: Making Competitors Irrelevant, was named among the "Ten Marketing Books You Should Have Read" by Advertising Age in 2011 and named one of the top 3 marketing books of the year by Strategy and Business. Aaker also has a regular column in American Marketing Association's Marketing News called "Aaker on Branding".

Aaker was one of the eleven people included in the 2007 book Conversations with Marketing.

Work

Aaker Model
Aaker is the creator of the Aaker Model, a marketing model that views brand equity as a combination of brand awareness, brand loyalty, and brand associations. The model outlines the necessity of developing a brand identity, which is a unique set of brand associations representing what the brand stands for and offers to customers an aspiring brand image.

Aaker primarily sees brand identity as consisting of 8–12 elements which fall under four perspectives:
 Brand as Product – consists of product scope, product attributes, quality or value of the product, uses, users and country of origin.
 Brand as Organisation – consists of organizational attributes and local workings versus global activities.
 Brand as Person – consists of brand personality and customer-brand relationships.
 Brand as Symbol – consists of audio and visual imagery, metaphorical symbols and brand heritage.

Aaker first introduced the model in his book Building Strong Brands (1996).

Publications
Aaker is the author of more than 100 articles and 14 books on marketing and branding.
 1991. Managing Brand Equity, second edition 2009 
 1996. Building Strong Brands 
 2001. Developing Business Strategies 
 2000. (with Erich Jachimsthaler) Brand Leadership: The Next Level of the Brand Revolution 
 2004. Brand Portfolio Strategy: Creating Relevance, Differentiation, Energy, Leverage, and Clarity 
 2005. From Fargo to the World of Brands: My Story So Far 
 2007. Strategic Market Management 
 2008. Spanning Silos: The New CMO Imperative 
 2010. Brand Relevance: Making Competitors Irrelevant, Jossey-Bass 
 2011. Brand Building and Social Media
 2011. Preference vs. Relevance  2011. Winning the Brand Relevance War 2011. Eight Characteristics of Successful Retail Concepts 2011. Personal Branding Interviews: David Aaker''
 2014. "Aaker on Branding", Morgan James Publishing,

References

External links
 David Aaker's Blog

1938 births
Living people
Branding consultants
Business educators
American business theorists
Marketing theorists
Marketing people
American marketing people
Advertising theorists
American business writers
MIT Sloan School of Management alumni
Stanford University School of Humanities and Sciences alumni
Haas School of Business faculty
Stanford Graduate School of Business alumni
People from Fargo, North Dakota